Allogalathea is a genus of squat lobsters, containing the following species:
Allogalathea babai Cabezas, Macpherson & Machordom, 2011
Allogalathea elegans (Adams & White, 1848)
Allogalathea inermis Cabezas, Macpherson & Machordom, 2011
Allogalathea longimana Cabezas, Macpherson & Machordom, 2011

Bibliography 
 Cabezas, P.; Macpherson, E.; Machordom, A. (2011). Allogalathea (Decapoda: Galatheidae): a monospecific genus of squat lobster? Zoological Journal of the Linnean Society, 162(2): 245-270.

References

Squat lobsters